Douglas Barr (born 1 February 1935) is a former Scottish first class cricketer and a member of Cricket Scotland's Hall of Fame.

A fast bowler, Barr once took 10 for 24 when playing with Melville College. His 88 first class wickets for Scotland is second only to Jimmy Allan.

References

External links
Cricket Europe

1935 births
Living people
Scottish cricketers
Cricketers from Edinburgh